La León is a 2007 Argentine drama written and directed by Santiago Otheguy. Set in Northern Argentina, the film tells the story of a homosexual fieldworker, Álvaro (Jorge Román), and his relationship with a local bully, El Turu (Daniel Valenzuela). On its release the film received average reviews and won a Teddy Award.

Plot
On an island in the Paraná Delta of Argentina, Álvaro (Román) works as a fisherman and a reed cutter. His homosexuality and love of books make him an outsider in the small village. The brutish El Turu (Valenzuela) captains La León, the town ferry. He views Álvaro as a threat, bullying him almost constantly. However, as the film progresses, El Turu's hidden attraction to Álvaro becomes obvious.

Cast
 Jorge Román as Álvaro
 Daniel Valenzuela as El Turu.
 José Muñoz as Iribarren
 Alfredo Rivas as Misionero I
 Juan Carlos Rivas as Misionero II
 Mirta Duran Rivas as Mujer misionera
 Esteban Gonzalez as Hermano misionero I
 Alberto Rivas as Hermano misionero III
 Mirta Rivas as Hermana Misionera
 Lorena Rivas as Nina misionera
 Aida Merel as Bibliotecaria
 Diego Quiroz as Marinaro Julio
 Mariano González as Joven del Yate
 Marcos Woinsky as El Alemán
 Jimena Cavaco as Laura
 Elba Estela Vargas as Madre de Laura
 José Aguilar as Jornalero
 Ignacio Jiménez as Chico Lopez
 Pedro Rossi as Vendedor del Astillero
 Daniel Sosa as Gadea Padre
 Ana Maria Montalyo as Gadea Madre
 Hernan Sosa as El Muerto
 Leonardo Rodríguez as Hermano de Laura

Awards
 La León was awarded the 2007 Teddy Award at the Berlin International Film Festival.

References

External links
 

2007 films
Argentine LGBT-related films
2007 drama films
2000s Spanish-language films
Argentine black-and-white films
LGBT-related drama films
Argentine drama films
2007 LGBT-related films
2000s Argentine films